Cartoon Network is a Polish pay television channel aimed at children, which launched in 1998 as a localised feed of the U.S. television network of the same name. The channel is owned by TVN Group, a subsidiary of Warner Bros. Discovery.

History 
Cartoon Network Poland was launched on 1 June 1998 replacing Cartoon Network Europe.

On 30 September 2002, the channel began airing in Hungary and Romania, thus sharing its video feed with those countries while adding two additional audio tracks in Hungarian and Romanian.

On 1 March 2007, Cartoon Network Poland started broadcasting 24 hours a day. On 1 October 2008, a separate feed of Cartoon Network was created for Hungary and Romania, while the two additional audio tracks that were previously to the channel added in September 2002 were moved there. Both feeds are transmitted from Warsaw. The channel also carried a Toonami programming block between 2002 and 2006.

On 14 October 2015, Cartoon Network launched in HD.

On 1 September 2016, Cartoon Network Poland rebranded using Check It 4.0 package. On 4 June 2018 at 10PM, Cartoon Network Poland aired Cartoon Network Classics for the first time.

On 1 January 2021, Cartoon Network Poland began airing with the Czech license from RRTV.

See also
 Boomerang (CEE)

References

External links

Cartoon Network
Turner Broadcasting System Poland
Television channels in Poland
Television channels and stations established in 1998
1998 establishments in Poland
Polish-language television stations